T. tenuis may refer to:
 Tellina tenuis, the thin tellin, a marine bivalve mollusc species found off the coasts of north west Europe and in the Mediterranean Sea
 Typhlops tenuis, a harmless blind snake species found in Mexico, Guatemala and Honduras

See also
 Tenuis (disambiguation)